Finn Iles (born 15 August 1999) is a Canadian Mountain bike racer competing in Downhill cycling. He currently competes in the Mountain Bike World Cup points series races, in the Elite Downhill event.

Results

Juniors 

2nd British Downhill Series, Junior (Fort William, 2016) 
2nd UCI Junior DH World Cup (Leogang, 2016)
2nd UCI Junior DH World Cup (Mont-Sainte-Anne, 2016)
2nd UCI Junior DH World Cup (Vallnord, 2016)
1st UCI Junior DH World Cup (Fort William, 2016)
1st UCI Junior DH World Cup (Lenzerheide, 2016)
1st Crankworx DH Juniors (Les Gets, 2016)
1st UCI Junior World Championships (Val di Sole, 2016)

Elite 

5th UCI DH World Cup (Vallnord, 2018)
3rd Crankworx DH Rotorua (2018)
1st Crankworx Whistler Fox Air DH (2018)
1st Canadian National Championship (Panorama, 2019)
4th UCI DH World Cup (Fort William, 2019)
4th UCI DH World Cup (Maibor, 2020)
3rd Crankworx DH Innsbruck (2021)
4th UCI DH World Cup (Snowshoe, 2021)
2nd UCI DH World Cup (Lourdes, 2022)
2nd UCI DH World Cup (Lenzerheide, 2022)
3rd UCI DH World Cup (Vallnord, 2022)
1st UCI DH World Cup (Mont-Sainte-Anne, 2022)

References

1999 births
Living people
Canadian mountain bikers